Batis may refer to:

 Batis (plant), a genus of flowering, salt-tolerant plants
 Batis (bird), a genus of  birds in the wattle-eye family
 Batis (commander), an ancient military commander
 Batis (lens), a series of full-frame Zeiss lenses for Sony's E-mount 
 Batis of Lampsacus, an Epicurean philosopher
 Batis an invalid genus of moths

Genus disambiguation pages